Girls in Uniform (Spanish: Muchachas de Uniforme) is a 1951 Mexican drama film directed by Alfredo B. Crevenna and starring Irasema Dilián and Marga López. It is a remake of the 1931 German film Girls in Uniform, set in a female boarding school.

Cast
In alphabetical order
 Alicia Caro
 Lupe Carriles
 Irasema Dilián as Manuela Medina 
 María Douglas
 Anabelle Gutiérrez
 Magda Guzmán
 Marga López as Lucila 
 Patricia Morán
 Rosaura Revueltas
 Alicia Rodríguez

References

Bibliography 
 Ilana Dann Luna. Adapting Gender: Mexican Feminisms from Literature to Film. SUNY Press, 2018.
Jan-Christopher Horak. "Muchachas de uniforme (1951)."
Roberto Carlos Ortiz, "These Mexican Mädchen."

External links 
 
Videographic study of the three versions of Girls in Uniform

1951 films
1951 drama films
Mexican drama films
1950s Spanish-language films
Films directed by Alfredo B. Crevenna
Films set in boarding schools
Films about educators
Films featuring an all-female cast
Mexican films based on plays
Remakes of German films
Mexican black-and-white films
1950s Mexican films